Tako Natsvlishvili (born 9 October 1998) is a Georgian model. Born and raised in Georgia, she pursued her modeling career in New York City. She is known for her association with Giorgio Armani. Tako is currently signed with Next Management modeling agency.

Early life 
She was born in Tbilisi, Georgia. She started modelling when she was 14 years old. She has two brothers and one sister.

Career 
At 14 she was discovered by NEXT Model Management in Georgia. Tako walked fashion shows for Versace, Giorgio Armani, Dolce & Gabbana, Elie Saab, Ralph & russo, Christian Dior, Emilia Wickstead, Julien Mcdonald, Yohji Yamamoto, Ermanno Scervino, Moncler, Antonio Berardi, Roland Mouret, Hogan, Genny, Blugirl.

Tako recently became the new face for Armani Collezioni Spring-Summer 2016 collection.

She has also posed in Zuhair Murad Bridal collection 2016.

References 

1998 births
Living people
Female models from Georgia (country)
Models from Tbilisi
Expatriates from Georgia (country) in the United States